Jeffrey Richard Van Raaphorst (born December 7, 1963) is a former American football quarterback. After going to high school at Grossmont High School in La Mesa, California, Van Raaphorst attended Arizona State University. He led the Sun Devils football team to the Pac-10 championship in his senior year, where they won the 1987 Rose Bowl. He was the Rose Bowl Player of the Game.

Van Raaphorst made his professional debut in the NFL in 1987 with the Atlanta Falcons.  He played two games for Atlanta in the 1987 season.

Van Raaphorst's brother Mike Van Raaphorst was a backup quarterback behind Carson Palmer at USC in 1999.  His brother Billy Van Raaphorst is a college baseball umpire.

Van Raaphorst was inducted into the Rose Bowl Hall of Fame in 2006.

Van Raaphorst now serves as a color commentator for Arizona State football radio broadcasts.

Van Raaphorst has a son, Cade, who plays professional lacrosse for the Atlas Lacrosse Club of the Professional Lacrosse League

References

External links
Jeff Van Raaphorst at NFL.com
Jeff Van Raaphorst player bio at Arizona State University

1963 births
Living people
Arizona State Sun Devils football announcers
College football announcers
Arizona State Sun Devils football players
Denver Broncos players
Atlanta Falcons players
Players of American football from Columbus, Ohio
Players of American football from San Diego
American football quarterbacks
National Football League replacement players